Neman, is a town and the administrative center of Nemansky District in Kaliningrad Oblast, Russia, located in the historic region of Lithuania Minor, on the steep southern bank of the Neman River, where it forms the Russian border with the Klaipėda Region in Lithuania, and  northeast of Kaliningrad, the administrative center of the oblast. Population figures:

History

Ragnita (from Old Prussian: ragas, "spur"), founded in 1288, was a settlement of the Baltic (Old Prussian) tribe of Skalvians. It was contested by the Grand Duchy of Lithuania since its creation in the 13th century, and on April 23, 1289 it was conquered by the Teutonic Knights, who built a castle there between 1397 and 1409, which later became the seat of a Komtur.  Construction works were supervised by the Master of the Teutonic Order Konrad Fellenstein of Marienburg. A few decades later, a now-destroyed 25 meter guard tower was built onto the castle. The stronghold was called Landeshut, but the name did not become popular and the name Ragnit, after a local river, a tributary of the Memel (outside of Prussia called Neman), continued to be used.

Although the settlement had an important castle not only guarding the Prussian lands of the State of the Teutonic Order from the north but also serving as a military base for the Knights' campaigns into adjacent Samogitia, it was living in the shadow of the nearby city of Tilsit (present-day Sovetsk). In 1454, King Casimir IV Jagiellon incorporated the region to the Kingdom of Poland upon the request of the anti-Teutonic Prussian Confederation. After the subsequent Thirteen Years' War (1454–1466) the settlement became a part of Poland as a fief held by the Teutonic Knights. After the dissolution of the Order's State under its last Grand Master Albrecht von Hohenzollern, Ragnit on April 10, 1525 became a part of the Duchy of Prussia, which was ruled by the House of Hohenzollern as a fief of the Kingdom of Poland until 1657. The duchy was inherited by the Hohenzollern margraves of Brandenburg in 1618, becoming an integral part of Brandenburg-Prussia, whereby remote Ragnit retained its status as a regional capital.

Ragnit was devastated by Tatars during the Second Northern War in 1656 and again by Swedish forces during the Scanian War in 1678, while the "Great Elector" Frederick William of Brandenburg had achieved full sovereignty over Ducal Prussia by the 1657 Treaty of Wehlau. His son and successor Elector Frederick III elevated himself to a King in Prussia in 1701. He granted Ragnit town privileges on April 6, 1722. It was again destroyed during the Seven Years' War, this time by Russian forces in 1757.

Incorporated into the Province of East Prussia from 1815, Ragnit became a part of the German Empire upon the Prussian-led unification of Germany in 1871. Its castle, having long lost its defensive purpose, became a court and prison. On November 1, 1892, a railroad line linking the town with Tilsit (now Sovetsk) was opened. It was built to develop the wood industry in the area, but the development did not actually start and the area's economy remained dominated by food production. When Germany had to cede the Klaipėda Region north of the Neman River to the Conference of Ambassadors according to the 1919 Treaty of Versailles, Ragnit became a border town. In 1922, it lost its status as an administrative capital in favor of Tilsit. It was the location of a Nazi prison under Nazi Germany.

During World War II, on January 19, 1945, Ragnit was captured without a fight by the 3rd Belorussian Front of the Red Army in the course of the East Prussian Offensive. Much of the town was destroyed in the fighting, including the castle, which remains ruined. In accordance to the 1945 Potsdam Agreement, the town became a part of Kaliningrad Oblast of the Russian SFSR. It was renamed to Neman in 1946. Most of the local inhabitants who had not fled during the Soviet conquest of East Prussia were subsequently expelled to Germany in accordance with the Potsdam Agreement.

Administrative and municipal status
Within the framework of administrative divisions, Neman serves as the administrative center of Nemansky District. As an administrative division, it is, together with nineteen rural localities, incorporated within Nemansky District as the town of district significance of Neman. As a municipal division, the town of district significance of Neman is incorporated within Nemansky Municipal District as Nemanskoye Urban Settlement.

Lithuanian community
Located in the historic region of Lithuania Minor, for centuries Ragnit was an important center of Lithuanian culture. From 1549 to 1563, famous Lithuanian writer and translator (who wrote the first book in the Lithuanian language, "Catechismusa Prasty Szadei" ("The Simple Words of Catechism")) Martynas Mažvydas was priest and Archdiacon of Ragainė. While living in Ragainė he wrote "The Song of St. Ambrosy" (with a dedication in Lithuanian), translated "The Form of Baptism" from German into Lithuanian, published "The Prussian Agenda" into the prayer "Paraphrasis". One of his major works was "The Christian Songs" (Giesmės Krikščioniškos). In the 19th century, after the January Uprising when the Lithuanian language was banned from the office in all of Russian-ruled Lithuania, books in that language were printed in Ragnit and then smuggled to Russia by the Lithuanian book smugglers (knygnešiai). The first issue of the Lithuanian newspaper Auszra was published in the town in 1883. According to German data 17,500 Lithuanians lived in the Ragnit district in 1890 (32% of the population). In 2010 Lithuanians composed 2.8% of the town population, being the third largest ethnic group after Russians and Belarusians.

Notable people

 Martynas Mažvydas (1510–1563), Lithuanian priest, writer, translator
 Johann Friedrich Domhardt (1712-1781), Administrator, Agriculturalist
 Johann Friedrich Reiffenstein (1719–1793),  German painter, antiquarian
 Julius Bacher (1810–1889), German novelist
 Martynas Jankus (1858-1946), Lithuanian printer, publicist
 Erich Klossowski (1875-1949), German-Polish art historian, painter
 Walter Bruno Henning (1908–1967), German scholar

International relations

Twin towns and sister cities
Neman is twinned with:
 Jurbarkas, Lithuania
 Lida, Belarus
 Ostróda, Poland
 Preetz, Germany

References

Notes

Sources

External links
Unofficial website of Neman 
Interview with Ivan Artyukh who heads the Ragnit Castle redevelopment project (English)

Cities and towns in Kaliningrad Oblast
Populated places established in the 1280s
Castles in Russia
Castles of the Teutonic Knights
Lithuania Minor
Nemansky District